The Deputy Secretary of Commerce is a high-ranking position within the U.S. Department of Commerce. It was created on December 13, 1979, when President Jimmy Carter sent a letter to the U.S. Senate and nominated Luther H. Hodges Jr., who then currently held the title of under secretary of commerce. The deputy secretary serves as the department’s chief operating officer, with responsibility for the day-to-day management of its approximately $11.4 billion budget, 13 operating units, and 46,000 employees. In that capacity, the deputy secretary is also a member of the President’s Management Council. The current deputy secretary is Don Graves, who was sworn in on May 14, 2021.

History
The deputy secretary serves as the principal deputy of the secretary of commerce in all matters affecting the department and performs continuing and special duties as the secretary may assign including, as may be specified by the secretary, the exercise of policy direction and general supervision over operating units not placed under other Secretarial Officers or other Department officials. In addition, the deputy secretary acts as secretary if the secretary has died, resigned, or is otherwise unable to perform the functions and duties of the office of secretary.

Rebecca M. Blank was the deputy secretary of commerce until she stepped down on May 31, 2013. She was confirmed by unanimous consent by the U.S. Senate in March 2012. She had been serving as acting deputy secretary since November 18, 2010. She replaced Dennis F. Hightower, who was deputy secretary of commerce from August 2009 to August 2010.

Patrick D. Gallagher was appointed acting deputy secretary on June 1, 2013. Bruce H. Andrews was confirmed as the next deputy secretary on July 24, 2014.

List of deputy secretaries of commerce

References

External links
The official biography of Sampson, the former Deputy Secretary
The mission and organization of the Department of Commerce, in which the Deputy Secretary's functions and duties are listed
Executive order on the line of succession for the Secretary of Commerce

Deputy Secretary of Commerce
United States Department of Commerce officials
Commerce